The Yehawmilk stele, de Clercq stele, or Byblos stele, also known as KAI 10 and CIS I 1, is a Phoenician inscription from c.450 BC found in Byblos at the end of Ernest Renan's Mission de Phénicie. Yehawmilk (Phoenician  ), king of Byblos, dedicated the stele to the city’s protective goddess Ba'alat Gebal.

It was first published in full by Melchior de Vogüé in 1875. In the early 1930s, the bottom right corner of the stele was discovered by Maurice Dunand. The main part of the stele is in the Louvre, whilst the bottom right part is in the National Museum of Beirut.

Text of the inscription
The inscription reads:

{|
|+ 
|-
| (line 1-2) || ’NK YḤWMLK MLK GBL BN YḤRB‘L BN BN ’RMLK MLK / GBL || I am Yehawmilk, King of Byblos, the son of Yeharbaal, grandson of Urimilk, King of Byblos,
|-
| (2) || ’Š P‘LTN HRBT B‘LT GBL MMLKT ‘L GBL  || whom Baalat Gebal made king of Byblos.
|-
| (2-3) || WQR’ ’NK / ’T RBTY B‘LT GBL WŠM‘ [H’] QL  || I call to my Lady of Byblos, and [She] hears (my) voice.
|-
| (3-4) || WP‘L ’NK LRBTY B‘LT / GBL HMZBḤ NḤŠT ZN ’Š BḤ[ṢR]H Z  || I built for my Lady Baalat Gebal that bronze altar that is in this cou[rt-temple] of Hers,
|-
| (4-5) || WHPTḤ ḤRṢ ZN ’Š / ‘L PN PTḤY Z  || and that gold engraving that is opposite this inscription of mine,
|-
| (5) || WH‘PT ḤRṢ ’Š BTKT ’BN ’Š ‘L PTḤ ḤRṢ ZN || and that gold bird that is on the stone «TKT» (pillar?) that is next to that gold engraving,
|-
| (6) || WH‘RPT Z’ W‘MDH WHR[’]ŠM ’Š ‘LHM WMSPNTH  || and that portico and its columns, and the ca[pi]tals upon them, and its ceiling.
|-
| (6-7) || P‘L ’NK / YḤWMLK MLK GBL LRBTY B‘LT GBL  || I, Yehawmilk, King of Byblos, made (this work) for my Lady Baalat Gebal.
|-
| (7-8) || KM ’Š QR’T ’T RBTY / B‘LT GBL WŠM‘ QL WP‘L LY N‘M || When I call to my Lady Baalat Gebal, She hears my voice, and does good things to me.
|-
| (8-9) || TBRK B‘LT GBL ’YT YḤWMLK / MLK GBL || May Baalat Gebal bless Yehawmilk, King of Byblos.
|-
| (9) || WTḤWW WT’RK YMW WŠNTW ‘L GBL || And may She grant him long life, and may She prolong his days and years (as king) over Byblos.
|-
| (9) || K MLK ṢDQ H’ || For he is a righteous king.
|-
| (9-10) || WTTN / [LW HRBT B]‘LT GBL ḤN L‘N ’LNM WL‘N ‘M ’RṢ Z || May [the Lady Ba]alt of Byblos grant [him] favor in the eyes of the gods and in the eyes of the people of this land,
|-
| (10-11) || WḤN ‘M ’R-Ṣ / Z [WḤN L‘N] KL MMLKT || and may She grant favor to the people of this land, [and favor in the eyes of] the whole kingdom.
|-
| (11-12) || WKL ’DM ’Š YSP LP‘L ML’KT ‘LT MZ-BḤ / ZN || And as for any person who shall continue to work on this altar
|-
| (12) || [W‘LT PT]Ḥ ḤRṢ ZN W‘LT ‘RPT Z’ || [and on] this gold [engrav]ing and on this portico,
|-
| (12-13) || ŠM ’NK YḤWMLK / MLK GBL [TŠT ’T]K ‘L<T> ML’KT H’ || my name, «Yehawmilk, King of Byblos», [will you place, together with] your own (name), upon that work.
|-
| (13-14) || W’M ’BL TŠT ŠM ’TK W’M TS-R / M[L’]KT Z’ || If you do not place my name with yours (upon it), or if you remove this w[or]k,
|-
| (14) || [WTS]G ’T [PTḤY] Z DL YSDH ‘LT MQM Z || [or if you mo]ve this [inscription of mine] and its base from this spot,
|-
| (14-15) || WTGL / MSTRW  || or if you reveal its hiding-place,
|-
| (15) || TSRḤ[W] HRBT B‘LT GBL ’YT H’DM H’ WZR‘W || the Lady Baalat Gebal shall make that man and his progeny stink
|-
| (16) || ’T PN KL ’LN G[BL] || before all the gods of By[blos] (i.e., She will make them disgusted by the gods).
|}

Footnotes

Citations

References
 Melchior de Vogüé, Stèle de Yehawmelek, roi de Gebal; Comptes rendus des séances de l'Académie des Inscriptions et Belles-Lettres, 19ᵉ année, N. 1, 1875. pp. 24–49. DOI : https://doi.org/10.3406/crai.1875.68196
 L'Art Phénicien, La sculpture de tradition phénicienne, catalogue du musée du Louvre, Département des Antiquités Orientales, A. Caubet, E. Fontan, E. Gubel, 2002, Ed. de la Réunion des musées nationaux, Paris, p. 64–65.

1874 archaeological discoveries
Phoenician inscriptions
Archaeological artifacts
Near East and Middle East antiquities of the Louvre
Kings of Byblos
Phoenician steles
Collections of the National Museum of Beirut
KAI inscriptions